In applied mathematics, Basin-hopping is a global optimization technique that iterates by performing random perturbation of coordinates, performing local optimization, and accepting or rejecting new coordinates based on a minimized function value. The algorithm was described in 1997 by David J. Wales and Jonathan Doye. It is a particularly useful algorithm for global optimization in very high-dimensional landscapes, such as finding the minimum energy structure for molecules. The method is inspired from Monte-Carlo Minimization first suggested by Li and Scheraga.

References 

Optimization algorithms and methods
Randomized algorithms